Natalie Depraz (born 1964) is a French philosopher. She is a specialist in German philosophy, phenomenology, and, more specifically, Edmund Husserl. She is a professor at the University of Rouen Normandy and an academic member of the Husserl Archives at the École normale supérieure (ENS/CNRS).

Early life and education
Natalie Depraz was born in 1964.

She graduated from the École normale supérieure de Fontenay-Saint-Cloud (1984) and obtained her agrégation in philosophy in 1988. In 1993, she defended her doctoral thesis at the Paris Nanterre University, entitled: .

Career
From 1995 until Francisco Varela's death in 2001, she worked closely with the neurobiologist and the psychologist Pierre Vermersch, with whom she wrote  (2011), published in English in 2003 under the title: On becoming aware. A pragmatics of experiencing. This early research on the link between phenomenology and neuroscience has kept her busy ever since. 

After having been a resident at the Fondation Thiers, then a secondary school teacher for three years, she became a lecturer at the University of Paris-Sorbonne University in 2000. After her habilitation in 2004, she was elected professor at the University of Rouen Normandy in 2006. In 2018, she founded the Rouen School of Phenomenology, which she continues to direct.

Since 2020, she holds the Chair of Excellence in Philosophy at Galatasaray University in Istanbul: "Phenomenology of Deeper Learning Systems via Networks of Convolutive Neurons "4.

She has also published two novels, in 2019 and 2021.

She was an unsuccessful candidate in the 2017 French legislative election, 2020 Paris municipal election, and 2022 French legislative election.

References

1964 births
Living people
Academic staff of the University of Rouen Normandy
Academic staff of Paris-Sorbonne University
Academic staff of Galatasaray University
French National Centre for Scientific Research scientists
21st-century French philosophers
Phenomenologists
ENS Fontenay-Saint-Cloud-Lyon alumni
Paris Nanterre University alumni
Women founders
School founders
Candidates for the 2022 French legislative election